Indonesia and Iraq established diplomatic relations in 1950. Diplomatic relations are important since they share similarity as Muslim majority countries. Indonesia is the most populous Muslim country in the world, while Iraq also a Muslim majority nation. Diplomatic relations were established  in 1950. Indonesia has an embassy in Baghdad, while Iraq has an embassy in Jakarta. Both nations are members of the Non-Aligned Movement and Organisation of Islamic Cooperation (OIC).

History
Relations were commenced since centuries ago. Ancient Iraq and Indonesian archipelago were connected to the maritime Silk Road of Indian Ocean trade, where goods and ideas travels. The Srivijaya empire back in 8th-century has established contacts with Islamic Caliphate in the Middle East. In 13th century Islam arrived in Indonesia, and slowly it became the majority religion in the archipelago since 16th-century.

Islam become the link between Indonesia and Iraq, as numbers of traders and ulamas spread Islam to Indonesian archipelago. Numbers of Arabic books and literatures travels through trade links and ports, and finally reach Indonesia. The Arabian Nights tales has caught the imaginations of Indonesians, popular even since the antiquities of Indonesian sultanates and kingdoms.

Since 1950, both countries have signed around 15 agreements to boost bilateral ties. Indonesia has maintained its embassy in Baghdad during various crises, such as the Iran–Iraq War in the 1980s.

In 2003, the Indonesian government and people did not support a U.S.-led military campaign against Iraq. Over 50,000 Indonesian people crowded the streets of the Indonesian capital, Jakarta on Sunday, February 9, 2003, to protest the United States' threat of military action against Iraq. At the height of the Iraq War, Indonesia temporarily closed its embassy in Baghdad in 2003. Because of the gradually improving security situation in Iraq, Indonesia reopened its embassy in June 2011. Since then, relations between the two countries have developed at a fast pace. Both nations are in the process of reviving their bilateral relations, which were stalled due to the war in Iraq.

Economy and trade
Traditionally Indonesia sees Iraq as the source of energy, such as oil and gas. On the other hand, Iraqi people are familiar with Indonesian exported products such as tires, soaps, spices, and other daily-use products.

Iraq, the second-largest oil producer in the Organization of Petroleum Exporting Countries (OPEC), is aiming to increase its bilateral trade with Indonesia to US$1 billion in 2013 via a recently signed oil sale and purchase agreement and increasing its non-oil and gas imports direct from Jakarta.

Indonesia's bilateral trade value with Iraq increased to US$154 million in 2011, from US$52 million in 2010. However the value decreased in 2012, according to Indonesia's Central Statistics Agency (BPS), the value of bilateral trade in 2012 was just $45 million. Both countries signed a memorandum of understanding in March 2013 during a visit by Coordinating Economic Minister Hatta Rajasa to Iraq. Under the agreement, Iraq will supply 35,000 barrels per day (bpd) of oil starting from May 2013.

Refugees and migration
After 2003 invasion, Iraq fell into civil war and the country become volatile as violence engulf the country. Iraq is included in Indonesia's immigration red list. Many countries, including Indonesia, still consider Iraq a dangerous place, and a number of Iraqi citizens illegally enter Indonesian territory each year in their attempts to reach Australia. Because of security reasons, Iraq is among 13 countries whose citizens are required to provide specific documents to enter Indonesia.

See also 
 Foreign relations of Indonesia
 Foreign relations of Iraq

References 

 
Iraq
Bilateral relations of Iraq